Jair Veiga Vieira Tavares (born 13 February 2001) is a Portuguese professional footballer who plays as a forward for Scottish Premiership club Hibernian. Tavares has previously played for Benfica and represented Portugal in youth internationals.

Career
Tavares came through the Benfica youth system, and played for their B team during the 2020–21 and 2021–22 seasons. 

On 15 June 2022 joined Scottish club Hibernian for an undisclosed fee on a contract until the summer of 2026.

Personal life
Born in Portugal, Tavares is of Cape Verdean descent. He hails from a footballing family, with both of his brothers, Cláudio and Miguel, as well as cousin Renato Sanches, all being professional footballers.

Career statistics

Club

Notes

References

2001 births
Living people
Portuguese footballers
Portuguese people of Cape Verdean descent
Portugal youth international footballers
Association football forwards
Liga Portugal 2 players
S.L. Benfica B players
Portuguese expatriate footballers
Expatriate footballers in Scotland
Portuguese expatriate sportspeople in Scotland
Hibernian F.C. players
Scottish Professional Football League players